Five cities made the shortlist with their bids to host the 2004 Summer Olympics (formally known as Games of the XXVIII Olympiad), which were awarded to Athens, on September 5, 1997. The other shortlisted cities were Rome, Cape Town, Stockholm and Buenos Aires.

Final selection 
In the first round of voting, Buenos Aires and Cape Town tied with the lowest number of votes. Round two was therefore a tie-breaker round between the two cities, with Buenos Aires being eliminated. Stockholm was the next city to be eliminated followed by Cape Town. The final round saw Athens receive enough votes to defeat Rome and win the right to host the 2004 Summer Olympics.

Official voting results 
Athens was the leader in all rounds of voting, except in Round 2, which was a tie-breaker due to a first round tie between Cape Town and Buenos Aires. Cape Town won that round over Buenos Aires, before losing out in the 4th round.

Bidding cities

Candidate cities

Applicant cities 
  Rio de Janeiro, Brazil
  San Juan, Puerto Rico
  Istanbul, Turkey
  Lille, France
  Saint Petersburg, Russia
  Seville, Spain

See also

References 

Bids
 
Summer Olympics bids
20th century in Lausanne
Events in Lausanne
1997 in Switzerland
September 1997 events in Europe